Railroaded! is a 1947 American crime film noir directed by Anthony Mann starring John Ireland, Sheila Ryan, Hugh Beaumont and Jane Randolph.

It was loosely based on the real-life case of Majczek and Marcinkiewicz, the same case that inspired Call Northside 777.

Plot

The innocent owner of a van that is unsuspectingly used in a back-room bookie operation robbery is "railroaded" (in other words, convicted on the basis of false, weak, or uncorroborated evidence) for the killing of a cop during the getaway.

Clara Calhoun is a beautician with a shop in New York. Her shop is in fact a front for a bookmaking operation. One evening when she closes up for the night, she gives a silent signal to two masked gunmen lurking outside. These two bandits then burst into the shop and hold up both Calhoun and her unsuspecting assistant, Marie Westin. The money they steal is betting money from the illegal operation.

During the robbery, a policeman on patrol in the neighborhood hears Westin's screams. He sees the hold up and tries to interrupt the robbery. As the policeman intervenes, he shoots one of the robbers, "Cowie" Kowalski, but is then shot and killed by the other robber, Duke Martin. The two robbers then escape the scene in a laundry truck, and Martin drops off Kowalski at a doctor's house for medical care. Before leaving Martin reminds Kowalski of the plan to implicate a certain Steve Ryan in the crime.

Later on, Calhoun and Westin are interrogated by detectives Mickey Ferguson and Jim Chubb. Westin describes both robbers as black-haired, but Calhoun insists that one of them, the "shooter", had sandy hair. Calhoun's version is believed, and soon the sandy-haired Steve Ryan, who usually drives the laundry truck and whose Navy scarf was found at the shop, is found and brought in for questioning. After a round of tough questioning by Ferguson and Chubb, Steve Ryan is then taken to a hospital, where Kowalski identifies him as the killer.

Steve Ryan claims that he is being framed by Kowalski for something he didn't do. He says the reason for this is that he beat up Kowalski for making a pass at his sister Rosie Ryan. But the detectives don't believe his story. Calhoun too confirms Kowalski's identification, and the unfortunate Steve Ryan is arrested. His sister Rosie Ryan is sure of her brother's innocence.

Rosie Ryan pleads her brother's case to detective Ferguson, but he is quite convinced of Steve Ryan's guilt and intends to perform a thorough investigation. Calhoun, who has come up with the robbery scheme together with Martin, and who in fact is her boyfriend, starts drinking heavily, angering Martin in the process.

When it turns out Kowalski dies from his gunshot wound, Rosie Ryan goes over to Calhoun's apartment and confronts her about her identification. A fight ensues between the two women. Martin watches the fight while hiding, and afterwards he enters the room and tells Calhoun he will "straighten out" Westin before Rosie Ryan talks with her. Martin also tells Calhoun that she should lay low and disappear for a while, until Steve Martin's trial. Rosie Ryan goes straight to Westin's beauty shop, but is unable to find her. Also looking for Westin is Ferguson, and he finds her outside the shop and offers her a ride home. Rosie Ryan accepts the ride, and on the way, Ferguson confesses his doubts about Steve Ryan's guilt.

Back at home, Rosie Ryan receives a message from Martin, telling her to come to the Club Bombay, which he manages. Rosie Ryan goes to meet Martin at the club, and in the meantime Ferguson breaks into and inspects Calhoun's now-deserted apartment. He finds a lead in a photograph of Martin, which connects the two. Since Ferguson has had dealings with Martin before, he recognizes the photo and goes to the club to question Martin about his relation to Calhoun.

Martin suggests to Rosie Ryan that he knows who is framing Steve Ryan, and Rosie Ryan denounces Ferguson in front of Martin. Ferguson doesn't give up though, concernedly warning Rosie Ryan to stay away from Martin. However, Rosie Ryan is determined to do anything to get her brother off the hook, and puts more trust in Martin. Martin reveals to Calhoun his intent to rob Jacklin Ainsworth, Calhoun's gambling boss and the owner of Club Bombay. In an attempt to discover the relation between Calhoun and Martin, Ferguson waits outside Calhoun's hideout apartment. When Martin appears and is about to enter the building, Ferguson makes his presence known to him.

Martin tries to get out of the compromising situation by accusing Calhoun of double-crossing him. He then runs off, and Ferguson goes inside to speak with her. Ferguson tells her that Westin has been found dead in the river. Because of this, he advises Calhoun to call him later at Rosie Ryan's house for her own protection. Meanwhile Martin finds another solution to his problem, by convincing an alcoholic named Wino to confess to the robbery in exchange for a sum of money. He then talks to Rosie Ryan and assures her that Wino's statements will get Steve Ryan out of jail.

Rosie Ryan buys the whole concept and goes home to get money for Wino. Martin goes back to Calhoun's apartment, but she isn't there. He discovers the frightened Calhoun calling Ferguson from a drugstore. Calhoun arranges to meet Ferguson at her apartment, but before the detective arrives Martin shoots her down. Martin then goes to Club Bombay, where he shoots and robs Ainsworth. Aware that Calhoun had called Rosie Ryan's phone number, Martin waits for her at the club and accuses her of betraying him.

Just when Martin is about to shoot Rosie Ryan too, Ferguson arrives with the police, having ordered a raid on the club. In the ensuing commotion, Martin manages to fire at Rosie and wound her, but not fatally. Martin is then killed in a shootout with Ferguson. Steve Ryan is eventually released from jail, and Ferguson and Rosie Ryan kiss each other.

Cast
 John Ireland as Duke Martin
 Ed Kelly as Steve Ryan
 Sheila Ryan as Rosie Ryan
 Hugh Beaumont as Mickey Ferguson
 Jane Randolph as Clara Calhoun
 Charles D. Brown as Police Capt. MacTaggart
 Clancy Cooper as Detective Jim Chubb
 Peggy Converse as Marie Weston
 Hermine Sterler as Mrs. Ryan
 Keefe Brasselle as Cowie Kowalski
 Roy Gordon as Jackland Ainsworth

Reception

Critical response 
Critic Roger Westcombe praised the film, writing, "It's a standard frame-up story, solidified through the strength of Mann's directing skills beyond the merits of the material. Preceding his now legendary teaming with cinematographer John Alton for the unbeatable run of Raw Deal, T-Men, Border Incident, and He Walked by Night, Railroaded! is still very dark but grim. The absence of Alton's breathtaking set-ups pedestrianises this effort into something merely heavy-handed. Mann’s transitional work Desperate (1947), also pre-Alton, gained an edge of complexity through Raymond Burr's latent menace and a more nuanced study of human corruption than is found here.  Yet for all these shortcomings Railroaded's tension is remarkably well maintained, primarily due to the acting of all the principals."

Film critic Dennis Schwartz, gave the film a mixed review, writing, "A second-rate crime thriller made before Anthony Mann (Desperate) reached prime time. Railroaded is a well-crafted and fast-paced mystery tale. It's a low-budget film noir that is held together by John Ireland's nasty performance as the heartless villain without redemption ... The plot was uninteresting and predictable, while the acting was so-so."

References

External links
 
 
 
 
 Railroaded! informational site and DVD review at DVD Beaver (includes images)

1947 films
1947 crime films
American crime films
American black-and-white films
Eagle-Lion Films films
1940s English-language films
Film noir
Films directed by Anthony Mann
Producers Releasing Corporation films
1940s American films